Kédange-sur-Canner (Lorraine Franconian: Kedéngen/Kiedéngen). is a commune in the Moselle department in Grand Est in north-eastern France.

Population

See also
 Communes of the Moselle department

References

External links
 

Kedangesurcanner